Samuel Thomas Houghton is a British inventor. In April 2008, at the age of 5, he received a patent for his "Sweeping Device With Two Heads" invention. He is thought to be the youngest person to have been granted a patent for their invention.

Invention
In 2006, at the age of 3, Sam Houghton saw his father sweeping their back yard using two different brooms: one to clear up the larger leaves and twigs and another to pick up finer debris. Believing that there must be an easier way to do the job, Houghton strapped two different brooms together with a large rubber band.

Houghton's father, Dr. Rev. Mark Houghton (a patent attorney) was impressed by the invention. On 14 October 2006 he filed a patent application at the UK Intellectual Property Office (UKIPO) naming Sam as the sole inventor, which was granted on 2 April 2008 when Sam was 5 years old.

Patent applications do not always record ages but a spokesperson for the UKIPO said that they have "never come across anyone as young as Sam who has been successful in their application and believe he is the youngest yet".

Inspiration
The patent application thanks Archie The Inventor from children’s TV series Balamory as Sam Houghton's inspiration to invent, although not for the invention itself, which Mark Houghton insists was all Sam's work. A press release by the UKIPO suggests that Wallace and Gromit also served as Sam's inspiration. Wallace and Gromit, the main characters in a series of animated films by Nick Park, front the UKIPO's "Cracking Ideas" campaign intended to get young people inventing.

Patent
Granted patents can last for up to 20 years such that Sam Houghton will have the opportunity to develop and market his product when he is older, if he wishes. However, Mark Houghton had said that obtaining the patent was more about letting Sam have some fun and teaching him about innovation than about marketing the product. Nevertheless, Mark was keen that Sam's achievement be used to highlight the "Cracking Ideas" campaign.

References

External links
 Cracking Ideas

Houghton, Sam
Living people
Year of birth missing (living people)